Nocturna is a 2007 Spanish animated fantasy film directed by Adrià García and Víctor Maldonado. The film was produced in 2007 by Filmax Animation.

Plot
In the aging orphanage, the days pass very uneventfully, but the nights are something quite different; at least for Tim they are. The light reflected from the stars is the only cure for his fear of the dark.

The other kids get mad at Tim after he refuses to retrieve a ball that fell into the basement, due to the darkness.
One night, the other kids steal the doorknob to the doors to the window that he has been keeping, forcing Tim to travel to the rooftop to see his favorite star. Once there, he manages to spot it, when suddenly it disappears. Unfortunately, it's not going to be the last one.

Tim also discovers a peculiar character that goes by the name of the Cat Shepherd together with his faithful cat Tobermory, the latter to become Tim's personal guardian. The Shepherd is in charge of making children sleep peacefully, but Tim is not about to go to bed. He needs his star more than anything in the world, and will do what it takes to see it shine in the night sky once again.

Tim convinces the Shepherd to take him to see Moka, the guardian of the night within the Night World and pleads for him to return the stars to the night sky. Moka pays scarce attention to the boy's pleas, so Tim asks the Cat Shepherd to take him to the Lighthouse of the Stars, where he thinks he may find the answer to the strange phenomena. Tim, the Shepherd, and Tobermory race against the clock through the streets of Nocturna, a world in which hundreds of the most diverse creatures work to create the night as we all know it. Little by little our friends will discover something strange is happening. An ominous threat, known as "The Darkness", is putting the night and the inhabitants of Nocturna in danger. In the end, it turns out that The Darkness was created through Tim's fear of the dark. After tricking the Darkness into approaching him, Tim manages to overcome his fear, defeat The Darkness, and save Nocturna. The next day, Tim surprises his friends by retrieving the ball from the basement. Impressed, they decide to play with him again.

See also
 List of animated feature films

External links
 

2007 fantasy films
2007 films
British animated films
2000s children's fantasy films
2000s French animated films
French animated films
French fantasy films
Spanish animated films
2000s Spanish-language films
Best Animated Film Goya Award winners
2007 animated films
2000s British films